The 2018 season was Clube de Regatas do Flamengo's 123rd year of existence, their 107th football season, and their 48th in the Brazilian Série A, having never been relegated from the top division.

The club will participate in the Brazilian Série A, the 2018 Campeonato Carioca (the Rio de Janeiro State League), Copa do Brasil and the CONMEBOL Copa Libertadores.

For the first time since 2010 Flamengo advanced past the Copa Libertadores group stage but were eliminated in the round of 16 by Cruzeiro. Flamengo finished runner-up in the Brasileirão behind Palmeiras after leading the league for much of the first half of the season before the league's pause during the 2018 FIFA World Cup.

Kits
Flamengo unveiled their 2018-2019 home kit ahead of their first match of the 2018 Brasileirão season against Vitória. Flamengo renewed their outfit partnership with Adidas, originally signed in 2013. They unveiled their new white away kit ahead of their May 31 match against Bahia.

Adidas unveiled Flamengo's third kit for the 2018-2019 season on 23 July. It is part of Adidas' line of kits produced from recycled plastic, and its blue color is an allusion to the beaches of Rio de Janeiro.

Supplier: Adidas / Sponsor: Caixa / Back of the shirt: MRV / Lower back: Descomplica / Shoulder: Universidade Brasil / Sleeves: Carabao / Numbers: TIM / Socks: Kodilar

{|  style="margin-left: auto; margin-right: auto; border: none"
|
|
|
|
|
|

|

Season overview

Pre-season 

Flamengo finished 6th in the 2017 Brasileirão and therefore qualified directly to the 2018 Copa Libertadores group stage and the 2018 Copa do Brasil round of 16.

On January 8 it was made official that head coach Reinaldo Rueda would be leaving Flamengo to manage the Chile national team (who had failed to qualify for the 2018 FIFA World Cup). Ruelda took Flamengo to the finals of the 2017 Copa Sudamericana and the Copa do Brasil, failing to win either. Under him, promising youth academy players Vinícius Júnior and Lucas Paquetá were given opportunities to play larger roles for the club. At the time of the announcement, Flamengo had already come to an agreement with coach Paulo César Carpegiani, manager of Flamengo for their 1981 Copa Libertadores and world championship season. This would be his third spell at Flamengo. The possibility of Ruelda leaving and Carpegiani coming in were already presumed in December.

The first player to depart Flamengo in 2018 was Márcio Araújo, one of the longest-serving players currently on the squad. He arrived in 2014 and had played 219 matches for the club. He left for a two-year contract with Chapecoense.

On January 16, Marlos Moreno was announced as Flamengo's first loan signing of the season. Moreno was on loan to Girona in Spain and is under contract with Manchester City.

On January 24 CONMEBOL, the football governing body of South America, announced that Flamengo would be forced to play their first two home matches of the Copa Libertadores behind closed doors with no fans present. This was a punishment for the chaos during the second leg of the 2017 Copa Sudamericana final where crowds of Flamenguistas forcefully attempted to enter the Maracanã  stadium without tickets. CONMEBOL determined that insufficient security and planning on Flamengo's behalf were at fault. The club was also fined $300,000. It was also announced at this time by the CONMEBOL Disciplinary Tribunal that Colombian defensive midfielder Gustavo Cuéllar would be suspended for Flamengo's first two Libertadores matches for insulting comments made to the referee while receiving the silver medal after the Copa Sudamericana finals.

On the 29th Flamengo announced the return of goalkeeper Júlio César after 13 years of playing in Europe. He signed a 3-month contract with his home club before his planned retirement. He will wear the number 12 shirt (a retired number in honor of Flamengo supporters as the "12th man"). On February 1 the club announced the signing of striker Henrique Dourado from Fluminense until the end of 2021 for $3.5 million.

On February 7, Italian club Udinese announced the signing of 21 year-old striker Felipe Vizeu for $6 million. He remained with Flamengo until the World Cup break.

Paolo Guerrero 
In December 2017 Peruvian striker Paolo Guerrero, under contract with Flamengo until August 2018, was banned by FIFA from all competitive fixtures for one year after testing positive for traces of cocaine. Twelve days later on appeal, his ban was reduced to six months thus making him eligible for the World Cup in June. For this period he was not permitted to train at Flamengo's facilities and the club supervised his pre-season activities from off-site. On January 14 Flamengo suspended his contract and withheld salary for a period of three months, a permissible act for an ineligible player. In February it was announced that the World Anti-Doping Agency planned to appeal against his reduced ban in the Court of Arbitration for Sport. Guerrero participated in three matches for Flamengo after his six-month ban ended in May, but on May 14 WADA's appeal was successful and Guerrero was suspended for an additional two months on top of the year-long ban, making him ineligible until 2019. At this time Flamengo suspended his contract again, further damaging ties between the player and the club. Guerrero was not pleased that the first contract suspension was made public and he sought retroactive payment of wages.

On May 31 the Swiss Federal Court granted a temporary freeze of his ban, permitting him to participate in the World Cup with Peru. On July 2 after Peru's elimination from the World Cup, Guerrero was re-presented at Flamengo. It was unclear if the Swiss court's decision to freeze the ban was still in effect. On July 18, after seeking clarification from CAS, CBF, FIFA and the Brazilian Superior Court of Sport Justice, the club received confirmation from CAS that the striker was free to participate in the Brazilian championship. He appeared on the Flamengo bench that evening against São Paulo.

After the expiration of his term with Flamengo on August 10, the striker signed a 3-year contract with Internacional.

January 
As one of Brazil's largest clubs, Flamengo's season always begins with high expectations from supporters and media. The club's first test is the traditional Campeonato Carioca – the Rio de Janeiro State league – contested among clubs in the top flight of the FERJ's league (separate from the national league pyramid). The most important matches in the state are between the “big 4” clubs in the city of Rio – Flamengo, Fluminense, Vasco da Gama, and Botafogo.

Flamengo debuted in 2018 against Volta Redonda on January 17 with a team of young players and won 2-0 with two beautiful goals from Lucas Silva and Pepê. Flamengo had contested the final of the 2017 Copa Sudamericana only a month prior, so much of the Flamengo starting lineup had only just begun preseason training. With mostly young players, Flamengo carried a perfect record through the first three matches of the state league with goals from “wonderkids” Vinícius Júnior and Lincoln.

The Rubro-Negro’s first real test, the Clássico of Millions against Vasco in the Maracanã, was a 0-0 disappointment featuring many of Flamengo's first-team starters. Nevertheless, the draw guaranteed a top finish in the group stage and qualification to the Taça Guanabara semifinals. On February 10 against Botafogo, new signing from Fluminense Henrique Dourado made his Flamengo debut and scored. In the final minutes of stoppage time the youngster Vinícius Júnior scored, guaranteeing the victory by a 3-1 scoreline and taunting the Botafogo supporters with a “crybaby” gesture, earning a yellow card after being swarmed by the Botafogo players. Three days later on the 13th, the president of Botafogo announced that they would not allow their home stadium of Nilton Santos to be used for the Taça Guanabara final after the “disrespectful” gesture by Vinícius Jr. and no apology from Flamengo. Flamengo went on to defeat Boavista in the final the following week, played at the Kleber Andrade Stadium in the neighboring state of Espirito Santos. Vinícius scored again and claimed Flamengo's 21st Taça Guanabara title, closing out the first phase of the Rio de Janeiro league and qualifying for the Campeonato Carioca final stage.

February 
The second phase of the Rio de Janeiro State League, the Taça Rio, coincided with Flamengo's first matches in the 2018 Copa Libertadores group stage. The long period of ill-will between the presidents of Flamengo and Botafogo appeared to be coming to an end prior to the “crybaby” incident. However, heavy winds and rain on February 15 caused two stadium light towers at  Estádio Luso Brasileiro to collapse. Flamengo had been renting Luso Brasileiro from Portuguesa since the beginning of 2017 after failures to come to agreements with the state government of Rio de Janeiro and the operators of the Maracanã over costs and match revenue.

After the judgement from CONMEBOL in January for Flamengo to play two home matches in the Libertadores behind closed doors, Flamengo made the decision to play their matches at the smaller Luso Brasileiro instead of the Maracanã. After the lighting fixture collapse, Flamengo was under pressure to announce a new venue prior to February 16. They reached a “peace treaty” with Botafogo in time to announce the rental of Nilton Santos stadium for two matches: their first match of the Taça Rio against Madueira on Feb 21 and their first match of their 2018 Copa Libertadores campaign against River Plate on February 28.

Flamengo rolled out their starters against Madureira in their Taça Rio opener for preparation against River Plate the following week and created 4 goals from some of their most important playmakers: Diego, Henrique Dourado, Lucas Paquetá, and Vinícius Júnior. Three days later, Flamengo preserved their starters (resting all but goalkeeper Diego Alves) and were soundly thrashed by rival Fluminense 4-0.

On February 28 Flamengo hosted Argentine giants River Plate at an empty Nilton Santos Stadium. River Plate took advantage of the calm atmosphere throughout the scoreless first half, before the “Grim Reaper” (“Ceifador”) – Henrique Dourado – broke the deadlock. Rodrigo Mora equalized for River. Éverton gave Flamengo the lead again with an assist from Paquetá, but Camilo Mayada scored a goal from outside the box to finish the match 2-2, two leads lost by the Brazilians.

March 

Flamengo returned to Rio action with a third “disappointing” result in a row: an uninspiring 1-0 victory over Botafogo, the credit of an allowed offside goal. On March 7, beloved former Flamengo and Brazilian National Team goalkeeper Júlio César made his return to the club after 13 years in Europe. He signed a three-month contract with Flamengo prior to retirement and captained the match against Boavista, a 3-0 win.  The congested schedule took its toll on the club another time: Flamengo rested their starters for Copa Libertadores again and lost to Macae on March 10 for the first time in their history.

Flamengo travelled to Guayaquil, Ecuador for their mid-week Copa Libertadores encounter with Emelec on March 14 and youngster Vinícius Júnior cemented his legacy as a rising star. With his club trailing 1-0 after a goal from Brayan Angulo, Vinícius was put on in the 67th minute and scored twice before the final whistle. This was Flamengo's first victory away from home in the Libertadores since 2014 (also against Emelec).

The Rubro-Negro returned to the state league to rout Portuguesa 4-0 with a penalty save from Diego Alves, but a Vasco victory over Botafogo landed Flamengo in 2nd place in the group before their semifinal match against Fluminense. Because Fluminense held the advantage of finishing top of their group, a draw would advance them and eliminate Flamengo. The semifinal match was exciting and full of attacking chances, with Gum of Fluminense opening the score in the first minute of the second half.  Éverton equalized in the 86th minute but the team could not take the lead. Flamengo were eliminated from the second phase of the Carioca but were still guaranteed a place in the final stage.

Despite disappointments, Flamengo had collected the most points across the two group phases to finish top of the overall Rio de Janeiro State League table, and were paired with Botafogo in the semifinal on March 28. Luiz Fernando scored in the 39th minute for Botafogo and returned a taunt to the Flamengo supporters at the Maracanã: the “little smell” gesture (“cheirinho”) by covering his nose with his fingers, a reference to Flamengo fans “smelling the Hexa” in 2016, anticipating their club's sixth Brazilian championship that never came. Flamengo pressed in the second half but could not score as their rivals bunkered down. Flamengo were eliminated and Botafogo went on to defeat Vasco in the two-legged final on penalties.

The following day Flamengo announced that head coach Paulo César Carpegiani and football director Rodrigo Caetano had been fired. Carpegiani had been at his post for 17 matches and less than three months. Caetano had been with Flamengo since 2015 and the club had only won the 2017 Campeonato Carioca in that span, finishing runners-up in the Copa do Brasil and Copa Sudamericana that same year. The decision was made by the vice presidents of the club who felt that the team's performance against Botafogo was “shameful.” In an official statement, Carpegiani thanked the club and fans and wrote that he had won 11 of 17 matches, only one of their three defeats had been with the senior lineup, and Flamengo were currently top of their group in the Libertadores.

The Flamengo board began the process of hiring a new coach, interviewing with Cuca and Renato Gaucho and considering the possibility of tasking assistant coach 36 year-old Mauricio Barbieri as caretaker. Their goal was to have a new coach within a week to prepare for their April 18 Libertadores match against Santa Fe. Flamengo scheduled a friendly against Brazilian Série B side Atlético Goianiense on April 7. Barbieri oversaw the team for the match in which Júlio César started in goal. Atlético-GO scored first but Diego scored twice in the 2nd half and Henrique Dourade converted a penalty to earn a 3-1 victory in the friendly before the first round of the Brasileirão the following week.

April 
Mauricio Barbieri, hired at the start of 2018 as an assistant, was the acting head coach of Flamengo at the start of the Brazilian national league season. They began their season by flying northeast to meet Vitória. The match began perfectly with Paquetá scoring 16 seconds in, but ultimately the day ended in controversy. In the 10th minute Éverton Ribiero was sent off and a penalty was awarded to the home team for a wrongly assessed hand-ball in the box. In the 2nd half Flamengo took a 2-1 lead from an allowed offside Réver goal. The match ended in a 2-2 draw.

The club initially planned to host their second closed-door Libertadores home match at Nilton Santos again, but after coming to an agreement with the operators of the Maracanã they opted to play in the historic venue. The day before the match against Santa Fe, 45,000 fans attended open training in the Maracanã that was made available to the general public with reduced-price tickets. In the match, Henrique Dourado scored first from a corner kick in the 7th minute but conceded and finished as a 1-1 draw despite having several more scoring chances than their opponents. The result cast more doubt on the leadership and organization of the club.

The following weekend in the Maracanã, Fla faced América Mineiro in  Júlio César's farewell match with reduced-price tickets. Henrique Dourado scored twice to lift his team to victory.

On April 17 it was announced that Flamengo had reached a deal with São Paulo over the transfer of striker Éverton for €3.5m. Éverton had been with Flamengo for four seasons and 118 matches.

As the leader of Group 4 in the Libertadores with two draws and one win, Flamengo traveled to Bogotá to face Santa Fe once more. Their recent lackluster performances had resulted in more protests and demonstrations back home, and the club (specifically president Eduardo Bandeira de Mello) were physically accosted by angry fans at the airport. On the field Flamengo and Santa Fe finished 0-0, with critics calling it a fortunate result for Flamengo's most apathetic performance so far. There was controversy at the end when the referee blew the final whistle in the middle of a promising attack for the Brazilians. Fans and media remained critical of their continental play (3 draws in 4 matches), some lamented the poor decision to release coach Zé Ricardo in 2017 and others demanded a replacement for Barbieri. Flamengo were again harassed by a mob before their flight to Fortaleza to face Ceará in league play, with much of the criticism targeted towards Diego and the team's lack of passion. Goalkeeper Diego Alves threw a cup of coffee at the protesters in retaliation. In the match, team spirits were lifted with two goals from Vinícius Júnior and one from Diego himself, who celebrated by embracing the Flamengo supporters in the crowd. The solid victory relieved some pressure on the team, but situations were still complicated in a club election year and with a board of directors still uncertain about their head coach after a month of service.

May 
Flamengo's first domestic cup match came on May 2 away to Ponte Preta who they defeated 1-0. The following weekend Paolo Guerrero made his return after being suspended from competitive play for six months. The league match against Internacional in the Maracanã set a season attendance record Flamengo, who were victorious 2-0. In the home leg of their cup tie against Ponte Preta, Flamengo played compact and advance to the Copa do Brasil quarterfinals for the 18th time with a 0-0 draw.

Much pressure had subsided for Flamengo who were playing better and had not conceded a goal in 5 matches, having one of the best defenses in Serie A along with Grêmio. Sitting atop the league they rested four starters (Diego Alves, Réver, Paquetá, and Éverton Ribiero) for Chapecoense in preparation for a decisive Libertadores fixture against Emelec. Flamengo lost 3-2, their first league loss and Chape's first win. They remained at the top of the league, tied on points with Corinthians and Atlético-MG. Guerrero scored his first post-suspension goal.

On May 16, Flamengo hosted Emelec for their first home Libertadores match in front of a crowd. The club announced new security measures and traffic controls. Everton Ribiero scored both Flamengo goals in a 2-0 victory just days after the birth of his newborn son. The result guaranteed Flamengo's qualification to the knockout round of the competition for the first time since 2010, and with a group stage match to spare.

The same week, TAS announced that they had extended Paolo Guerrero's suspension an additional eight months after appeal from WADA. He would miss the World Cup, and Flamengo suspended his contract for a second time.

In the 6th round of the Brasileirao the Rubro-Negro fought rival Vasco da Gama to a 1-1 draw. Vinicius scored, Rever came off due to injury, and the match ended with four player expulsions including Cueller and Rodolfo. Flamengo fell to 2nd place in the league behind Atletico Mineiro.

Set to face River Plate in the Monumental de Nuñez for control of first place in the group, midfielder Diego and head coach Mauricio Barbieri were suspended for their infractions against Emelec. Travelling supporters greeted the players with festivities and support in Buenos Aires. Flamengo played cautiously and the match ended scoreless, landing them at second place in the group.

With top spot in the league at stake, the club from Rio traveled to Belo Horizonte to face leaders Atletico Mineiro. Flamengo won 1-0, and with a Corinthians loss to Internacional the following day they moved back into the league leadership.

On May 28, Lucas Paquetá was listed on Brazilian National Team head coach Tite's 12-man standby roster for the 2018 World Cup. Paquetá was the youngest player listed on standby. However he was not called up to the main squad.

June 
With Libertadores and Copa do Brasil fixtures only resuming after the World Cup, Flamengo looked to take advantage of the following five rounds in the Brasileirão. On May 31 they defeated Bahia 2-0 in the Maracanã with a superb goal from Paquetá to preserve their tight lead in the table. After two months of Barbieri's caretaken tenure it was clear that he would soon become official and the club was still searching for coordinators to support him. On May 31 Paolo Guerrero was granted permission to play for Peru in the World Cup and he soon departed for training. Many of Flamengo's following matches would be played without Guerrero and Trauco (of the Peru national team) and Cuellar (on Colombia's selection).

Flamengo went on to defeat Corinthians at home, Fluminense in the capital city of Brasília, and Paraná Clube back in the Maracanã to open up a 6-point lead in the table after five straight victories. They outscored opponents 8 to 0 in that span with three goals contributed by Felipe Vizeu. On June 10 in the Maracanã, Vinícius Júnior and Felipe Vizeu gave a tearful farewell after defeating Paraná 2-0 in their final home match with Flamengo before departure to Europe (Vinícius to Real Madrid and Felipe to Udinese).

The final match before the World Cup break was against Palmieras at Allianz Parque. The final score was 1-1, keeping Flamengo four points above Atlético-MG and São Paulo, but it ended in chaos as three players from each side (Cuéllar, Jonas, and Henrique Dourado for Flamengo) were sent off in the final minutes.

On June 19, Flamengo confirmed the appointment of Mauricio Barbieri as official head coach after 72 days as the interim. He led Flamengo into the World Cup break as league leader, 11 victories in 18 matches and at least one goal scored in every match. His new agreement allows for the possibility of renewal in 2019.

June - July 
President Eduardo Bandeira expressed the importance of signing reinforcements to replace Éverton, Felipe Vizeu, and possibly Paulo Guerrero in preparation for a challenging August featuring Copa do Brasil and Copa Libertadores ties against tough opposition. On June 11, the club agreed to a -year contract with the operators of the Estádio Maracanã for first preference for Flamengo home matches and an agreeable rental price. In the wake of this agreement, Flamengo terminated their contract with Portuguesa to rent the Ilha do Urubu stadium until the end of 2019 but confirmed that their lawsuit against the construction company that installed the collapsed lighting towers would continue.

On June 22, defensive midfielder Jonas was sold to Saudi Arabian club Al-Ittihad for R$9 million (€2.1m). On the same day, Flamengo announced the signing of their first reinforcement: Colombian striker Fernando Uribe on a free transfer from Toluca. On July 17 the club announced contract renewals for defenders Rodinei and Thuler.

The Brazilian Serie A pauses for the World Cup every four years while the lower leagues continue. Flamengo's first match after the break resulted in their first loss in eight matches. Third-place club São Paulo visited the Maracanã and Éverton scored against his former team three months after being transferred. The Tricolor closed the gap to 1 point. Flamengo ended July with two home victories against Botafogo and Sport, and a draw against Santos at the Vila Belmiro. Uribe opened his account for Flamengo against Sport, and academy product Matheus Sávio made his impact in place of Vinícius Jr, scoring after 5 minutes against Botafogo. Paquetá's goal in that match badly injured and hospitalized Botafogo goalkeeper Jefferson.

On July 24 the club's signing of Vitinho from CSKA Moscow was confirmed after the Russian club accepted Flamengo's offer of €10m, Flamengo's most expensive signing and one of the most expensive signings in Brazilian club history. At this time, Flamengo was also attempting to move defensive midfielder Willian Arão to Olympiakos but the player did not agree to the contract terms.

August 
Flamengo were scheduled to participate in a daunting nine matches in the month of August, three matches each against Grêmio and Cruzeiro. On July 30, citing leg pain, Guerrero chose not travel with the team away to Porto Alegre for their Copa do Brasil match. Tite and European scouts were in attendance for the match against Grêmio. New transfer Vitinho made his debut, and 17 year-old Lincoln came on in substitution and scored dramatically late to equalize.

On August 2 Flamengo announced the signing of Paraguayan midfielder Robert Piris da Mota. Flamengo announced that Vitinho, Uribe, Savio, and Piris would replace Everton, Vinicius, Felipe Vizeu and Jonas on their Copa Libertadores round of 16 30-man roster.

On August 5, São Paulo takes over the lead in the Brasileirao after an embarrassing 2-0 loss by Flamengo to Grêmio's mostly reserve lineup. With Lucas Paquetá unavailable in their Libertadores match against Cruzeiro, Flamengo were stunned 2-0 at home on the 8th. They suffered an early goal from Arrascaeta that they could not recover from, finding themselves at serious risk of elimination from the Copa Libertadores round of 16. Flamengo had difficulty organizing themselves without Paquetá.

The club's tumultuous relationship with Guerrero reached its end on Aug 10. He did not train with the team for the week and Barbieri did not list him for Flamengo's league match against Cruzeiro on the 12th. He was released as a free agent and Internacional signed him to a 3-year contract.

By this point, the number of goals conceded by Flamengo had increased from 0.54 per match for their first 35 matches to 1.14 over their last seven matches. Flamengo faced Cruzeiro once again the following weekend in league play and earned a better result: with Paquetá available and coach Barieri insisting that the team would not preserve starters for the Libertadores or Copa do Brasil, Flamengo won 1-0 on a goal from Henrique Dourado who re-entered the starting lineup after the departure of Guerrero and a thigh injury suffered by Uribe. The team finished the first half of the league season in second place.

According to Barbieri, the league victory against Cruzeiro gave Flamengo the confidence needed in the return-leg of their cup tie against Grêmio. In a crowded Maracanã, Éverton Ribeiro scored early and withstood Grêmio's pressure, with only 40% total possession of their own. Flamengo eliminated Grêmio 2-1 on aggregate and advanced to the semifinal against Corinthians.

On August 17, Tite and the Brazilian National Team announced the call-up of Lucas Paquetá for the first time for a pair of friendlies against the USA and El Salvador in September. Since the friendlies would coincide with key Copa do Brasil semifinal matches, the Selecao only called up one starter from each participating club. Flamengo president Bandeira expressed outraged at the decision to call Paquetá. The club's request to release Paquetá from the friendlies was rejected by CBF. Paquetá came on in substitute against El Salvador in Washington, D.C. on 11 September and still started and played 73 minutes against Corinthians the very next night in the Maracanã. Flamengo U-20 goalkeeper Hugo was also called up for the friendlies but did not play.

On August 19 Flamengo were humiliated in league play against Atlético Paranaense, conceding three goals in the first 21 minutes. Suffering the absences of Diego and Réver on suspension, Barbieri's positional adjustments and the team's low-intensity start surrendered the points early. Cuellar denied that a fight had occurred in training between him and Rodinei following the loss. On August 22 it was determined that Flamengo would host the first leg of their Copa do Brasil semifinal tie against Corinthians.

Flamengo renewed center-back Léo Duarte's contract through 2022.

Flamengo kept afloat in the league with a 1-0 home victory over Vitória (goal scored by Diego) but disappointingly conceded the equalizing goal against América-MG in the 87th minute after an undisciplined sending-off of Cuellar in the second half. They remained four points behind leader São Paulo.

The September 15 league match against Vasco da Gama was confirmed to be played at the Mané Garrincha in Brasília.

Regarded as Flamengo's "game of the year" by Barbieri, the Copa Libertadores away leg against Cruzeiro on August 29 would require Flamengo to overcome a 2-0 deficit. Still without Fernando Uribe, the Rubro-Negro played well and won 1-0 by a goal from Leo Duarte but it was not enough to overcome the mistakes of the first leg. Flamengo were eliminated from the Libertadores in the round of 16.

Roster
As of the end of the season.

First-team squad 

Players with Dual Nationality
   Diego Alves
   Diego
   Rhodolfo

Reserves

Transfers and loans

Transfers in

Loan in

Transfers out

Loan out

Staff

Managerial changes

Competitions

Overview

Friendlies 
Flamengo didn't play any pre-season match in 2018 and the only friendly of the year was on 7 April, few days after the elimination in Campeonato Carioca. The match was played against Série B club Atlético Goianiense.

Campeonato Carioca

Flamengo was drawn into Group A for the Campeonato Carioca, the Rio de Janeiro State League.

Taça Guanabara

Semifinal

Final

Taça Rio

Semifinal

Final stage

Copa Libertadores

The draw was held on December 20, 2017. Flamengo was drawn into Group D.

Group stage

Round of 16
The draw for the round of 16 was held on 4 June 2018, 20:00 PYT (UTC−4), at the CONMEBOL Convention Centre in Luque, Paraguay.

Campeonato Brasileiro

League table

Results by round

Matches
Goals and red cards are shown.

Copa do Brasil

As Flamengo participated in the 2018 Copa Libertadores, the club entered the Copa do Brasil in the round of 16. The draw was held on April 20, 2018.

Round of 16

Quarterfinals

Semifinals

Statistics

Appearances

Goalscorers
Players in italics transferred out of the club during the season.

Clean sheets

Disciplinary record
Players in italics transferred out of the club during the season.

Honors

Individuals

Attendance 
Includes all competition home matches in the 2018 season. Attendances recorded represent actual gate attendance, not paid attendance.

Source: Globo

Campeonato Brasileiro

Copa do Brasil

Copa Libertadores

Campeonato Carioca

References

External links
 Clube de Regatas do Flamengo
 Flamengo official website (in Portuguese)

Brazilian football clubs 2018 season
CR Flamengo seasons